Growing Up Wild is a 24-episode web series which premiered July 21, 2012 on The Pet Collective on YouTube, starring Robert and Bindi Irwin, children of The Crocodile Hunters Steve Irwin. Both Robert and Bindi live at the center of the 1,500 acre Australia Zoo. This is the thriving animal legacy of their father, and location for this series. Growing Up Wild features the siblings carrying on the work of their parents, educating audiences to the nature of exotic animals with a particular focus that not every animal makes a suitable domestic pet.

Episodes

Time-Life version
Growing Up Wild (retitled Madison's Adventures – Growing Up Wild for television broadcast) is a 30-minute program produced by the British Broadcasting Corporation (BBC) and WildVision running from 1992 to 1993. The show features an animated purple cat named Madison that takes the viewers around the world to find animals and their babies, big and small and how they spend their day.

Episodes

References

Australian non-fiction web series
Television series about mammals
Television series about birds
Television series about insects
Television series about arthropods
Television series about fish
Television series about reptiles and amphibians
Steve Irwin